The 2006 West Lancashire District Council election took place on 4 May 2006 to elect members of West Lancashire District Council in Lancashire, England. One third of the council was up for election and the Conservative party stayed in overall control of the council.

After the election, the composition of the council was:

Campaign
Before the election the Conservatives ran the council with a 4-seat majority over the Labour party. Most seats only had Conservative and Labour party candidates, with no Liberal Democrats standing in the election.

The Conservatives focused their campaign on crime and the environment, while targeting the Labour held wards of Burscough East, Burscough West and Scott. However Labour targeted the Conservative wards of Derby, Newburgh and Parbold, while criticising the Conservatives for holding a failed vote on transferring council housing.

Election result
The results saw the Conservatives increase their control of the council, which they had held since 2002. They gained 3 seats from Labour in Burscough East, Burscough West and Scott wards, with the Labour leader on the council, Alan Bullen, saying that it had "not been a good night".

Overall turnout in the election was 32.2%, which was up on 2003 but down from 2004.

Ward results

Ashurst

Aughton and Downholland

Aughton Park

Burscough East

Burscough West

Derby

Hesketh-with-Becconsall

Knowsley

Moorside

Newburgh

North Meols

Parbold

Scarisbrick

Scott

Skelmersdale South

Tanhouse

Tarleton

Up Holland

References

2006 English local elections
2006
2000s in Lancashire